Rozhen Observatory (НАО-Рожен; , NAO-Rozhen), also known as the Bulgarian National Astronomical Observatory, is an astronomical observatory, located in the Smolyan Province, 90 kilometers south of the city of Plovdiv, Bulgaria. The nearest town, Chepelare, is 15 kilometers away. The observatory is owned and operated by the Institute of Astronomy of the Bulgarian Academy of Sciences (BAS). It was officially opened on 13 March 1981, almost 20 years after Bogomil Kovachev – a professor of astronomy at BAS, known as its founder – had started working towards that goal. The Observatory is the largest in Southeastern Europe and has an active team of about 50 astronomers. It is the principal center for astronomical research in Bulgaria. The minor planet 6267 Rozhen, was discovered at, and named after the observatory.

With its total cost of over $10 million at the time, it still remains to day the largest one-time investment in scientific infrastructure that Bulgaria ever made.

Telescopes
 200 cm Ritchey-Chretien telescope (supplied with Coude focus)
 60 cm Cassegrain telescope
 50/70 cm Schmidt camera
 15 cm Solar telescope

WASP-3c & TTV 
Transit Timing Variation (TTV), a variation on the transit method, was used to discover an exoplanet WASP-3c by Rozhen Observatory, Jena Observatory, and Toruń Centre for Astronomy.

See also 
 List of astronomical observatories

References

External links 

 Official site
 Bulgarian National Astronomical Observatory
 Home Institute site
 (4486) Mithra (NEA) discovery in Rozhen Observatory 20 September 1987 by V. Shkodrov and E. Elst (IAUC 4464)

Bulgarian Academy of Sciences
Astronomical observatories in Bulgaria
Buildings and structures in Smolyan Province